Fashion in the 1990s was defined by a return to minimalist fashion, in contrast to the more elaborate and flashy trends of the 1980s. One notable shift was the mainstream adoption of tattoos, body piercings aside from ear piercing and, to a much lesser extent, other forms of body modification such as branding.

In the early 1990s, several late 1980s fashions remained very stylish among both sexes. However, the popularity of grunge and alternative rock music helped bring the simple, unkempt grunge look to the mainstream by 1994. The anti-conformist approach to fashion led to the popularization of the casual chic look that included T-shirts, jeans, hoodies, and sneakers, a trend which continued into the 2000s. Additionally, fashion trends throughout the decade recycled styles from previous decades, notably the 1950s, 1960s and 1970s.

Due to increased availability of the Internet and satellite television outside the United States, plus the reduction of import tariffs under NAFTA, fashion became more globalized and homogeneous in the late 1990s and early 2000s.

Women's fashion

Early 1990s (1990–1992)

Supermodels and high fashion
 Throughout the 1990s, supermodels dominated the fashion industry. The top models of the 1990s were Linda Evangelista, Cindy Crawford, Naomi Campbell, Tatjana Patitz, Eva Herzigova, Nadja Auermann, Christie Brinkley, Christy Turlington, Kate Moss, Carla Bruni, Tatiana Sorookko, Helena Christensen, Claudia Schiffer, Karen Mulder, Yasmin Le Bon, Nadège, Yasmeen Ghauri, Stephanie Seymour, Carolyn Murphy, Amber Valletta, Shalom Harlow, Kirsten Owen, Kristen McMenamy, Guinevere Van Seenus, Alek Wek, Karen Elson, Michele Hicks, Stella Tennant, Audrey Marnay, Amy Wesson, Maggie Rizer, Erin O'Connor, Kirsty Hume, Bridget Hall, Milla Jovovich and Tyra Banks.
One of the most influential group of models during the early 1990s was the Big Five, whose fame and social power allegedly surpassed that of many movie stars. The Big Five consisted of supermodels Naomi Campbell, Cindy Crawford, Christy Turlington, Linda Evangelista and Tatjana Patitz. Whether booked as individuals or as an elite group, each supermodel gained worldwide success and had great influence on the fashion industry. Naomi Campbell was the first black woman to grace the cover of French Vogue, Time, and American Vogue's September issue. Cindy Crawford was the highest paid model on the planet in 1995 per Forbes. Christy Turlington was known for being a reliable model who garnered over 500 covers during her career and most notably, signed a contract with Maybelline for an annual fee of $800,000 for twelve days' work. Linda Evangelista was known as the industry's "chameleon" for her ability to suit a multitude of styles. Evangelista also infamously coined the phrase, "We don't wake up for less than $10,000 a day." Tatjana Patitz, the last of the Big Five, continues to be regarded as one of the "original supermodels" and even after her retirement, she remains in demand periodically by such designer houses as Jean-Paul Gaultier and Chanel. Later in the decade, Tatjana was replaced in the Big Five by supermodel Claudia Schiffer, who is one of the most successful supermodels in the world, holding the record for the most magazine covers according to The Guinness Book of World Records.
Later in the decade, the rise of Kate Moss shifted the world of fashion when her entrance onto the scene turned the Big Five into the Big Six. Kate Moss became one of the nineties' biggest phenomena when, at 14 years of age, she was discovered at JFK Airport. Her waif-like figure set a new fashion standard that became known as "heroin chic." This was a pale and ghostly look that called for a stick-thin stature and size zero body. Due to Kate's extremely skinny frame, she was often criticized for allegedly promoting eating disorders as apparently evidenced by her shots for Calvin Klein. Reportedly, posters of Kate Moss were often defaced with graffiti that read "feed me".
For the 1994 Autumn/Winter issue of Arena Homme +, a spin-off of the bi-monthly Arena (magazine), master fashion photographer Albert Watson photographed a new generation of top male models of the era, including Tyson Beckford, Tim Boyce and Marcus Schenkenberg for the two-page fold-out cover proclaiming "High Five the New Supermodel Army - Malcom Tim, Marcus, In 1995 Gregg and Larry photographed by Albert Watson".

Neon colors
 In the US, USSR, South Africa, Egypt, and Japan popular trends included bold geometric-print clothing in electric blue, orange, fluorescent pink, purple, turquoise and the acid green exercise wear popularized by Lisa Lopes of TLC. Typical patterns included triangles, zigzag lightning bolts, diamonds, lozenges, rectangles, overlapping free-form shapes, simulated explosions inspired by comic book illustrations or pop art, intricate grids, and clusters of thin parallel lines in contrasting colors for example, white, black and yellow on a cyan background. Many women wore denim button-down Western shirts, colored jeans in medium and dark green, red, and purple, metallic Spandex leggings, halterneck crop tops, drainpipe jeans, colored tights, bike shorts, black leather jackets with shoulder pads, high waisted ankle length jeans (aka mom jeans) and pants both styled plain or pleated, baby-doll dresses over bike shorts or capri leggings, and skater dresses. Neon colored tops and leg warmers were popular, together with leopard print skirts shiny satin or rayon blouses, embroidered jeans covered in rhinestones, and black or white shirts, leggings and jackets printed with abstract red, blue, yellow and green geometric patterns. In America, popular accessories included court shoes, cowboy boots, headscarves, slouch socks, Keds, ballet flats, and the penny loafers or boat shoes associated with the preppy look.

Leggings and exercise-wear
 From 1991 on, sports bras, hoodies, shortalls, Leotards and bodysuits worn as tops with jeans, a sweatshirt especially Champion brand over a turtleneck with jeans rolled up to show off their slouch socks were popular with young girls, teens, college girls, and young women in the UK, Europe and America. A common outfit was to wear a skirt, dress shorts, babydoll or minidress with black opaque tights, white slouch socks, and white Keds athletic sneakers. It was not uncommon to see mothers dressed right along with their daughters in white slouch socks worn over black leggings or sweatpants (especially heather grey color), an oversized T-shirt, sweater or sweatshirt worn over a turtleneck, and Keds, Converse All Stars, or unisex aerobic, basketball or Nike Air or gold Reebok hi-top running shoes. A dressed up leggings outfit was leggings with an oversized v-neck sweater over a turtleneck, slouch socks, Keds (shoes) or Sperrys boat shoes, and bangs with a headband band or ponytail and scrunchie. Leggings worn over pantyhose or tights with a pair of flats were also common. Leggings and slouch socks with oversized tops and casual sneakers especially Keds continued to be worn as lounge wear and everyday comfortable and fashionable casual wear until the late 1990s. In Israel, Britain and the US, Gottex swimsuits became popular among female celebrities Diana, Princess of Wales, Brooke Shields, and Elizabeth Taylor.

Grunge
 In mid-1992, grunge fashion broke into the mainstream for both sexes. For younger American, Australian and Latina women, it consisted of flannel shirts, ripped jeans, mom jeans, shortalls, Doc Martens, combat boots, band t-shirts, oversized knit sweaters, long and droopy skirts, ripped tights, Birkenstocks, hiking boots, and eco-friendly clothing made from recycled textiles or fair trade organic cotton. A prominent example of the popularity of grunge fashion is the teen drama television series "My So Called Life". Grunge fashion peaked in late 1993 and early 1994.

Mid 1990s (1993–1996)

Glamour wear

 In 1994, grunge clothing rapidly declined as fashion became more feminine and form-fitting. Young women in the UK and America wore tailored skirt and trouser suits, short skirts and dresses, baby doll dresses, skater dresses, animal prints, hot pants, slim pants, high waisted ankle length jeans (aka mom jeans) and pants both styled plain or pleated, bright colors (even in colder months), long and short skirts, and high heels. High-shine fabrics, such as satin, metallics, sequins, microfiber, vinyl, and silk became very prominent on both clubwear and work wear. The most common look among young women that year was the short black slip dress worn over a tight, undersized white T-shirt. Loungewear generally consisted of black Lycra leggings or bike shorts, large T-shirts, oversized sweatshirts, turtlenecks, and baggy sweaters, slouch socks, Keds, white Sperry sneakers or athletic sneakers and hair in bangs and a ponytail with a scrunchie while at home running errands, at kids sporting events or other clubs and activities or relaxing during the weekends.
 A very popular look among young women from 1994 to 1995 was the "sexy school girl" look. This trend consisted of tartan minikilts, sometimes with bike shorts underneath, undersized sweaters, short slip dresses, baby doll tees, knee highs, pulled all the way up or rolled or folded at the top, thigh highs, miniature backpacks, overalls, tights, pantyhose, shirts and dresses with peter pan style collars and chunky shoes, mary janes, ballet flats, or boat shoes. Hair was down or in a high ponytail with a scrunchie. The sexy school girl look was prominently portrayed in films with female leads such as Clueless, Empire Records, and The Craft.
 Among women over 30, 1950s ladylike fashions made a comeback in the United States. This included pencil skirts, cardigans, girdles, petticoats, satin or lace Wonderbra lingerie, and fitted suits. Popular accessories that went hand-in-hand with this revival included brooches, white gloves, sheer stockings, diamonds, sequins, and red lipstick. For more casual occasions, women opted for lean capri pants, polka dot blouses, belted trench coats, 1940s style sandals, white canvas shoes especially Keds, leggings with oversized tops, slouch socks with leggings, rolled jeans or khakis or shorts or shortalls, shortalls, sweaters, sweatshirts, tunic tops, shorts suit with dress shorts with tights underneath, ballet flats and a top and jacket, above the knee dresses sometimes worn with bike shorts underneath, mom jeans, and leather jackets.
 Popular shoes and accessories during the mid-1990s in Europe and North America included loafers, Mary Janes, suede sneakers, mules, clogs, knee high boots, jelly shoes, go-go boots, black court shoes, Keds, ballet flats, silver jewelry, dainty earrings and necklaces, conch shell necklaces, berets, straw hats, floppy hats, gold jewelry, and hipster belts. Navel piercings had started to gain popularity around this time.

Work wear
For much of the early and mid 1990s, power dressing was the norm for women in the workplace: navy blue, grey or pastel colored skirt suits with shoulder pads, pussy bow blouses, silk scarves, pointed shoes, stretchy miniskirts, polka dot blouses, and brightly colored short dresses worn with a dark brocade blazer, bare legs and metallic open toed shoes. Other 1980s fashions such as chunky jewelry, gold hoop earrings with horn of life pendants, smoky eye make-up, hairspray, Alice bands, and brightly painted nails remained common. Shorts suits were also very popular. They consisted of a regular suit top and jacket and dress shorts with tights underneath worn with ballet flats.
By 1996, professional women in Britain, Australia and America wore more relaxed styles and muted colors, such as black floral print dresses, plain kaftan style blouses, Mary Janes, maxi skirts, knee length dresses, boots, smart jeans, big floppy hats, culottes, capri pants and chunky platform shoes. Trouser suits began to replace skirts, black or white tights and nude pantyhose made a comeback.

Late 1990s (1997–1999)

Asian influences

Beginning in 1997 and continuing into the mid-2000s, Southeast Asian and Indian fashion began to influence and gain greater recognition from the global media due to the establishment of the Fashion Design Council of India, and the hosting of India Fashion Week in Delhi. Inspired by Bollywood cinema and a resurgence of interest in 1970s fashion, designers in India adapted and repurposed the saree, churidar and kurta into the Anarkali ballgown from the early 1990s onwards. By the late 1990s, kurta tunics were turned into short dresses, and Manish Arora designed garish Hindu "God printed T-shirts" for both locals and global tourists. British, Asian and American designers also incorporated ethnic chic fabrics, such as khadi, paisley, silk or Indonesian Batik into Western-inspired clothing patterns such as shirts and blouses featuring traditional embroidery. This type of clothing was worn not only by the immigrant Bangladeshi, Pakistani and Indian diaspora in Britain, but also by many non-Indian women.

1970s revival
From 1997 onwards, many British and American designers started to take cues from the disco fashion of the mid–late 1970s. Particularly common were black or dark red pleather pants, animal print clothing, halter tops, metallic clothing, crop tops, tube tops, maxi coats, maxi skirts, knee boots sometimes with knee socks slouch at the top, and boot-cut dress pants. By 2001, popular mainstream trends included tight shirts, bell bottoms, platform shoes, fleeces, cropped tank tops, Union jack motifs inspired by the Cool Britannia movement, and military inspired clothing, such as flak jackets with camouflage patterns. 
In the late 1990s, bright colors began to make a comeback in mainstream fashion, as a backlash against the darker tones associated with the grunge and skater subculture. Popular colors included plum, chocolate, and navy, all of which replaced black, which had become ubiquitous. Other fashion trends popular from 1997 to 1999 included glamour wear, high-waisted miniskirts, plastic chokers, knee socks associated with the school girl look, tight pants, slip dresses, turtle-neck sweaters, conservative chic, capri pants, high-waisted trousers, and cardigans.
More formal styles intended for the workplace or special occasions (such as a cocktail party) included silk blouses in neutral colors or animal prints, tailored pantsuits and skirt suits inspired by the 1980s, collarless coats, and the little black dress, with or without subtle embroidery.

Casual chic

 From 1998 to 2001, the unisex casual chic look gained mainstream appeal, with dark stonewash jeans, shortalls, spaghetti strap crop tops, tracksuits, sweatpants, and other athletic clothing. Denim's popularity was at an all-time high in Europe, with designer denim jackets and matching jeans rocketing in prices. Other common, more affordable brands included Mudd, JNCO, and Evisu, a Japanese denim brand which launched in the 1980s. The most popular trainers were white or black and manufactured by Adidas, Skechers, and Nike. Running shoes with built in air pumps were popular among both sexes. Leather had largely replaced canvas, and soles were made of foam rather than solid rubber.
 In the US and Britain, popular accessories included large hoop earrings, shoes with rounded toes, flip flops, jelly shoes, rhinestone-encrusted hip belts, embellished slippers, beaded wristbands and lariats, Alice bands, pashminas, fascinators, gold jewelry, moccasin loafers, running shoes, jelly bracelets, bandanas, and novelty Wellington boots with leopard print or zebra stripe patterns.

Men's fashion

Early 1990s (1990–1992)

Casual clothing
 Continuing on from the late 1980s, many young men in the US, UK and Europe wore tapered and cuffed high waisted jeans or pants styled plain or pleated with matching denim jackets, Champion brand, Stone Island or Ralph Lauren sweatshirts, polo shirts with contrasting collars, short Harrington jackets, grey Tommy Hilfiger sweaters with prominent logos, oversized Guess denim shirts, brightly colored windcheaters especially in yellow or green, Hush Puppies shoes, Sperrys boat shoes, white Sperrys sneakers, V neck sweaters, soccer shorts, white athletic socks worn with black or brown loafers, triple striped tube socks usually folded over at the top, slouch socks, pastel colored three button sportcoats, graphic print T-shirts, tracksuit tops with a vertical contrasting stripe down the sleeve, sweatpants, bomber jackets, pale denim drainpipe jeans as worn by Ewan McGregor in Trainspotting, shiny red or blue rayon monkey jackets, grey or tan leather jackets with shoulder pads, and wool baseball jackets with contrasting sleeves. Short shorts were popular in the early years of the decade, but were replaced with looser and baggier basketball shorts in 1993 when hip-hop fashion went mainstream. Teva sandals were popular in 1993, its trend even endured to early 2000s.

Grunge look

 From 1991 until 1996, flannel shirts became very popular in the US and Australia, due to their use among the skater subculture and grunge bands including Nirvana or Mudhoney,. Unlike the fitted Western shirts of the 1970s which fastened with pearl snaps, the flannel shirts of the 1990s were padded and loose-fitting for optimum warmth. Men also wore acid wash jeans, patterned wool sweaters with turtlenecks underneath, black Schott Perfecto leather jackets, sheepskin coats, olive green anoraks, corduroy sportcoats, grey sweatpants and fingerless gloves.
 In the US, popular accessories included Converse All Stars, hi-top Nike's, trapper hats, bucket hats, baseball caps, baggy, graphic T-shirts, oversized sweatshirts, tuques, combat boots, Dr. Martens, and Aviator sunglasses.

Mid 1990s (1993–1996)

Cool Britannia and 1970s revival
 Around 1995/1996, 1960s mod clothing and longer hair were popular in Britain, Canada, and the US due to the success of Britpop. Men wore Aloha shirts, brown leather jackets, velvet blazers, paisley shirts, throwback pullover baseball jerseys, and graphic-print T-shirts (often featuring dragons, athletic logos or numbers). Real fur went out of fashion and fake fur became the norm.
 The 1970s became a dominant theme for inspiration on men's apparel in 1996. Among these clothing styles were coats with fur- or faux fur-trimmings, jackets with bold shoulders and wide lapels, and boot-cut slacks. This continued into the 2000s (decade). Casual clothes such as trousers, sweaters, and denim jackets were worn with shirts made of satin, PVC, and terry cloth. Both pastel colors and bold patterns were popular and successfully replaced black.
 Desirable accessories during the mid-1990s included loafers, desert boots, chelsea boots, gold jewellery, boat shoes, chunky digital watches, solid colored ties, shoulder bags, and black/neon colored high-top sneakers replaced combat boots.

Modern preppy
 Preppy clothing was popular in the US, where wealthy young men wore khaki slacks, canvas boat shoes, and navy blue blazers with breast-pocket monogram or gold buttons bearing a family crest. In general, 1990s preppy was more casual than the almost dandified look of the 1980s as young men abandoned ascots and Oxford shoes in favor of Nantucket Reds, nautical-striped T-shirts, boat shoes i.e. Sperrys, loafers, white style casual sneakers, slouch socks, and madras cloth or gingham short-sleeved shirts. Desirable brands included Gap, Old Navy and Abercrombie & Fitch.

Hip-Hop
 In Europe and North America, hip-hop fashion went mainstream in 1992, with oversized baseball jackets, baggy jeans, bomber jackets, Baja Jackets, and tracksuits popular among young men as casual wear. Simultaneously, industrial and military styles crept into mainstream fashion, with machinery pieces becoming accessories. Baseball caps started being worn forwards again.
 The eight-ball jacket created by designer Michael Hoban became popular in hip-hop fashion, particularly the East Coast hip hop scene of New York City. The style is characterized by bright color-blocking and large black and white decals on the back and sleeves, made to look like the eight ball used in some cue sports.
 Southern hip hop provided a platform for Fashion designers and musical artists to collaborate forming an influential subculture of anti fashion and alternative fashion designs, especially the popular recycled clothing worn by Arrested Development and Goodie Mob.
 Due to its association with rappers, sportswear became acceptable to wear in public throughout the mid to late 1990s, especially oversized T-shirts, baseball caps and sweaters bearing the New York Yankees logo, tennis shoes, hoodies, jean shorts, khaki cargo pants, baggy basketball shorts, chinos, tracksuits and black bomber jackets with orange linings. From 1995 onwards, men wore overalls, straight leg jeans, plaid pants, flat-front chinos, khaki pants, and camouflage pants worn ironically by anti-war protesters.
 In the late 1990s ski goggles became a popular accessory in hip hop fashion.

Late 1990s (1997–1999)

African fashion
During the mid and late 1990s, the silk Madiba shirt became popular in South Africa and the wider global community. From 1996 to 1998, traditional African clothing began to face serious competition from cheap imported mitumba clothing as a consequence of the Kenyan and Tanzanian government's easing of trade restrictions during the early to mid 1990s. By the end of the decade, the safari jacket associated with kleptocrat dictator Mobutu Sese Seko of the Democratic Republic of the Congo and the previous South African Apartheid regime had declined in popularity, and was replaced as formal wear by the dashiki suit. Variants in green, yellow and black were worn as an alternative to the business suit by many African-Americans for Kwanzaa. African art began to influence and gain greater recognition on account of the Festival de la Mode Africaine (FIMA). These influences started to make their way into fashion shows all over, for reference New York fashion week, 1998. In this show models were wearing sheath-like dresses made of loosely knitted yarn and denim jackets with large fake fur collars. Loose threads dangled from some of the garment's seams and other garments had the labels sewn on the outside of the collars.

Streetwear

 By the late 1990s, the grunge look became unfashionable, and there was a revival of interest in streetwear clothing, with name brand designers such as Calvin Klein and Ralph Lauren making a comeback. In Europe, jeans were more popular than ever before. From 1997 to 1998 brighter colors came into style, including plum, charcoal, olive, wine, and shades such as "camillia rose", "blazing orange", "whisper pink", "hot coral", and a light-grayish blue called "wind chime".
 Much of men's fashion in 1997 was inspired by the 1996 film Swingers, leading to the popularization of the "dressy casual" look. Such apparel included blazers, black or red leather jackets and bowling shirts in either a variety of prints or a solid color, and loose-fitting flat-front or pleated khaki chinos or jeans. Around this time it became fashionable to leave shirts untucked.

Business wear
 In Europe, single-breasted three and four button notch lapel suits in grey or navy blue, together with leather jackets based on the same cut as blazers, began to replace the double breasted 1980s power suits. The wide neckties of the early 1990s remained the norm, but the colors became darker and stripes and patterns were less common. In India and China, the Nehru suit and Mao suit declined in popularity in favor of conventional Western business wear. Tweed cloth and houndstooth sportcoats went out of fashion due to their association with older men. Dress shoes (usually in black) included chelsea boots with rounded or square toes, wingtips, and monkstraps.
 In America, an increasing number of men began to dress smart-casual and business casual, a trend kickstarted by Bill Gates of Microsoft. At more formal events such as weddings or proms, men often wear boxy three or four button, single-breasted suits with a brightly colored tie and an often matching dress shirt. Another trend was to wear black shirts, black ties, and black suits. Black leather reefer jackets and trenchcoats were also fashionable in the late 1990s, the latter inspired by The Matrix.

Youth fashion

General trends
 The dominant youth clothing fad at the beginning of the 1990s was fluorescent clothing, Hoop earrings, and plaid shirts. Popular colors for girls included coral, hot pink, bright mint, hot red, yellow, orange, and turquoise. It was not uncommon to see mothers dressed right along with their daughters in the leggings outfits and jeans outfits. Boys wore soccer shorts, jean jackets, tartan shirts, tracksuits, tapered acid wash jeans, colored jeans in bright and light mint green, red, and purple colors sweatpants, slouch socks and single, double or triple stripe athletic socks sometimes folded down at the top especially the triple striped ones worn with everything from shorts to rolled jeans and khakis. In the Southern Suburbs of Chicago during the late 1980s and early 1990s, Z Cavaricci pants and IOU sweatshirts were worn by members of the middle/upper-middle class.

 For much of the 1990s, particularly the middle years, teenage boys and girls bought and wore very simple clothes, such as shortalls, athletic shorts, dress shorts, high waisted ankle length jeans and pants plain or pleated. flannel shirts, grey knitted sweaters, and backpacks. Popular stores selling these items included Gap and Urban Outfitters. In the US, girls wore oversized tee shirts, mid calf dresses with leggings, oversized v-neck sweaters over a turtleneck, slouch socks, triple striped tube socks usually folded over at the top, black or white lace trimmed bike shorts with babydoll dresses, belts worn with dresses, skater dresses, dress shorts worn with tights and ballet flats, tights with slouch socks, crew neck T-shirts, Keds, Converse Chuck Taylor All-Stars, boat shoes, shortalls, leotards, overalls, bodysuits and pantywaist tops worn with jeans or skirts, long sleeved T-shirts, Nike Tempo athletic shorts, Mom Jeans and colored jeans especially in medium and dark green, red, and purple, and leggings with slouch socks, oversized tops, and sneakers especially Keds. In the late 1990s, American teenage girls imitated the look of British girl group All Saints, which consisted of baggy jeans, T-shirts, sweatshirts, tanktops, and trainers, as well as cargo pants, and crop tops.
 For many younger children, the 1990s was the Golden Age of Disney films with T-shirts and sweaters featuring characters such as Simba, Mickey Mouse, Belle, Aladdin, and Winnie the Pooh. Tartan trousers, striped shirts, long sleeved polo shirt, Champion (sportswear) crew neck sweatshirts worn over a turtleneck, colored jeans in bright mint, red, aqua and purple colors, d high waisted ankle length jeans and pants plain or pleated. athletic shorts especially soccer shorts, slouch socks, continuing from the 1980s triple striped tube socks usually folded over at the top through the early 1990s, and sweaters were worn by young boys and girls in the UK and the US. Blue denim and railroad stripe overalls and shortalls were also popular for girls, as seen on television and commercials throughout the decade, and for teenagers, some of whom would leave either strap hanging loose. Common outfits for tweens and teenage girls, was to wear an oversized tee, a Champion brand sweatshirt over a turtleneck, a babydoll dress with opaque tights or bike shorts, shorts with black opaque tights or leggings, white slouch socks, and either Keds, boat shoes such as the Sperry Top-Sider or Eastland brands, white Sperry sneakers, Rockport dress sneakers or Converse sneakers.

Subcultures of the 1990s

Grunge 

 The new wave and heavy metal fashion of the 1980s lasted until 1992, when Grunge and hip hop fashion took over in popularity. By the mid-1990s the grunge style had gone mainstream in Britain and the US, resulting in a decline in bright colors from 1995 until late 1999, and was dominated by tartan flannel shirts, stonewashed blue jeans, and dark colors such as maroon, forest green, indigo, brown, white and black.
 Grunge fashion remained popular among the skater subculture until the late 1990s as the hard-wearing, loose-fitting clothing was cheap and provided good protection. Members of the subculture were nicknamed grebos or moshers and included those who did not skate.

Psychobilly, punk and skater 

 Hardcore punk fashion, which began in the 1970s, was very popular in the 1990s, especially among the skater subculture. Common items for pop punk and nu metal fans included bright colored/blond tipped spiky hair, long under sleeves, black hoodies, and baggy pants in black, mint blue, or red Royal Stewart tartan.

 In the US, psychobilly bands Reverend Horton Heat and Rocket from the Crypt popularized brothel creepers, gas station shirts and dark-colored bowling shirts during the late 1990s.

Rave culture and clubwear 

 Popular fashion themes of the rave subculture during the early 1990s included plastic aesthetics, various fetish fashions especially PVC miniskirts and tops, DIY and tie dye outfits, vintage 1970s clothing, second-hand optics, retro sportswear (such as Adidas tracksuits), and outfits themed around sex (showing much skin and nudity, e.g. wearing transparent or crop tops), war (e.g. in the form of combat boots or camouflage trousers), postmodernism and science fiction themes. In the early 1990s the first commercial rave fashion trends developed from the underground scene, which were quickly taken up by the fashion industry and marketed under the term clubwear. Common raver fashion styles of the 1990s included tight-fitting nylon shirts, tight nylon quilted vests, bell-bottoms, neoprene jackets, studded belts, platform shoes, jackets, scarves and bags made of flokati fur, fluffy boots and phat pants, often in bright and neon colors.

 Common unisex hairstyles included neon colored spiky hair, natural dreadlocks, undercut hairstyles, and synthetic hairpieces, and many ravers in the US and Europe wore tattoos and body piercings. Widespread accessories included wristbands and collars, whistles, pacifiers, feather boas, cyberpunk inspired goggles, glow sticks, and record bags made of truck tarpaulins.

Hip-Hop 

 The early 1990s saw widespread interest in hip hop and gangsta rap due to the influences of MC Hammer, Tupac Shakur, Eazy-E, Dr. Dre, N.W.A, Wu-Tang Clan, and Public Enemy. The sagging trend began in the early 1990s and continued until the 2010s. Wide leg jeans, Plaid, Khakis, Locs glasses, bomber jackets, tracksuits and baseball caps and snapback hats worn backwards became popular among hip hop fans together with gold chains, sovereign rings, and FUBU T-shirts. By the end of the decade, hip hop fashion had influenced many global subcultures, especially the British chavs with their tracksuits and white trainers, the sneakerheads of America and Asia, and the ICP fans known as Juggalos with their all-black outfits and evil clown corpse paint.

Britpop 

 In the mid-1990s, indie rock, Madchester, and Britpop bands Blur, Stone Roses, and Oasis resulted in a revival of 1970s fashions, including Mod haircuts, aviator sunglasses, denim jackets, green parkas, harrington jackets, velvet sportcoats, striped shirts, Ben Sherman polo shirts, T-shirts bearing the RAF roundel, and Union Jack motifs including the dress worn by the Spice Girls' Geri Halliwell.

Goth 

During the mid to late 1990s, gothic fashion peaked in popularity among American, German and British teenagers seeking to break from the mainstream. Black leather trenchcoats, frilly poet shirts, winklepickers, velvet blazers, long black hair, fetish clothing, and tight pants were a common sight on both sexes, and girls often wore Victorian inspired corsets, lace gloves, Demonia boots, and short leather skirts.

Preppy 

 The conservative preppy look of the 1980s remained popular among wealthy teenagers in the Eastern US until the late 1990s, when many members of the subculture began adopting elements of hip hop fashion. Typical clothing for preppies of the 1990s included khaki chinos, and high waisted ankle length jeans and pants plain or pleated. vy blue blazers, Oxford shirts, brogues, Keds worn with everything especially leggings, slouch socks and oversized sweatshirts, sweaters and tees, boat shoes, ballet flats, coach jackets, baseball jackets, mom jeans, shortalls, jeans worn with a leotard or bodysuit as a top, shorts or skirts worn with blazers (for girls), shorts suit with dress shorts with tights underneath, ballet flats and a top and jacket, sweater over a turtleneck, and Champion crew neck sweatshirts worn over a turtleneck. A typical outfit included leggings with an oversized v neck sweater over a turtleneck, slouch socks, and Keds, Sperrys boat shoes or Sperrys white sneakers. Neat, well-groomed hairstyles were popular among upper elementary, middle school, high school and college age girls, including the bangs, straightened hime cut side bunches, or high regular ponytails worn with scrunchies and headbands many times in combination with bangs.

Hairstyles of the 1990s

Women's hairstyles

Women's hair in the early 1990s continued in the big, curly style of the 1980s. High and High sided ponytails continued through most of the decade, especially when playing sports and at the gym. These were worn with a scrunchie until the mid-1990s when hair ties began to replace scrunchies. Scrunchies became popular once again in the late 2010s. Bangs remained big throughout the decade, especially the "mall bangs" poofy style associated with the early 1990s. From 1994 and through 2000s they got smaller and somewhat flatter and less poofy and laid closer to the forehead.

The pixie cut and Rachel haircut, based on the hairstyles of Jennifer Aniston in Friends and Marlo Thomas in That Girl, were popular in America from 1995 onwards. Around the same time red hair also became a desirable color for women, as well as feathered bangs, and mini hair-buns. From 1995 until 2008, dark-haired women tended to dye their hair a lighter color with blonde highlights (popularized by Jennifer Aniston).

In the late 1990s, the Bob cut was well-desired, popularized and rejuvenated by Victoria Beckham of the Spice Girls. This late 1990s style bob cut featured a center, side, or zig-zag parting, as opposed to the thick bangs of the early 1990s. The Farrah Fawcett hairstyle made a comeback, with highlights going hand-in-hand with this revival. Other late 1990s haircuts included "Felicity curls" (popularized by Keri Russell in the hit TV show Felicity), the Fishtail Half-Up, and pigtails, as well as the continuation of mid 1990s hairdos.

Children's and teenager's hairstyles

For teenage boys longer hair was popular in the early to mid-1990s, including collar-length curtained hair, Long, unkempt grunge hair, blond surfer hair popular among some Britpop fans, and dreadlocks. During the mid-1990s, the much-ridiculed bowl cut became a fad among skaters, while hip-hop fans wore a variant of the flattop known as the hi-top fade. In the late 1990s, hair was usually buzzed very short for an athletic look, although a few grunge fans grew their hair long in reaction to this.

For teenage girls and younger children, hair was worn long with heavily teased bangs called "mall bangs" which were long fringes covering the forehead. From 1994 and through 2000s they got smaller and somewhat flatter and less poofy and laid closer to the forehead. Alice bands, headbands and scrunchies of various styles and colors (especially red, navy blue polka dot, plaid and neon) were popular with American girls throughout the early and mid 1990s, and they frequently wore them with twin pigtails, or high or high side ponytails and bangs. Beginning in the late 1990s and continuing into the 2010s, straightened hair and variants of the French braid became popular in Europe.

Men's hairstyles

The 1990s generally saw the continued popularity of longer hair on men, especially in the United States, Scandinavia and Canada. In the early 1990s, curtained hair, mullets, and ponytails were popular. Other trends included flattops, hi-top fades, and cornrows.

In the mid-1990s, men's hairstyle trends went in several different directions. Younger men who were more amenable had adopted the Caesar cut, either natural or dyed. This style was popularized by George Clooney on the hit TV show ER in season two, which premiered in mid 1995. More rebellious young men went for longer, unkempt "grunge" hair, often with a center parting. The curtained hairstyle was at its peak in popularity, and sideburns went out of style. Meanwhile, most professional men over 30 had conservative 1950s style bouffant haircuts, regular haircuts, or the Caesar cut.

In the late 1990s, it was considered unstylish and unattractive for men and boys to have longer hair. As a result, short hair completely took over. From 1997 onwards, aside from curtained hair (which was popular throughout the decade), spiky hair, bleached hair, crew cuts, and variants of the quiff became popular among younger men. Dark haired men dyed their spikes blonde or added wavy blonde streaks, a trend which continued into the 2000s. Variants of the surfer hair was popular among rock musicians during that time period. For African-American men, the cornrows (popularized by former NBA player Allen Iverson) and buzz cut were a popular trend that continued into the 2000s.

Makeup and cosmetic trends

Women's makeup in the early 1990s primarily consisted of dark red lipstick and neutral eyes. Around 1992 the "grunge look" came into style among younger women and the look was based on dark red lipstick and smudged eyeliner and eyeshadow. Both styles of makeup continued into 1994, but went out of style the next year.

The trends in makeup shifted in the mid-1990s. In 1995, nude shades became desirable and women had a broader color palette in brown. Another makeup trend that emerged was matte lipsticks, with deep shades of red and dark wine colors worn as part of night makeup. Blue-frosted eye shadow became fashionable, and was eventually integrated into the Y2K makeup of the late 1990s/early 2000s (decade). Gothic makeup had broken into the mainstream, having been made up of vamp lipstick (or even black lipstick), heavy mascara and eyeliner, often purple-tinted eye shadow (or else very dark blue), and extremely pale foundation. The Gothic makeup remained relevant in the later years of the decade.

By 1999, glittery, sparkling makeup had come into style. This was called "Y2K makeup", consisting of facial glitter and lip gloss. Blue-frosted eye shadow remained a staple of late 1990s makeup, although silver was ideal look. Dark eyeliner was considered bodacious. Pale, shiny lips became desirable, as lip gloss largely replaced lipstick. An alternative for those who did not like metallics were purples and browns. Goth makeup and Y2K makeup continued into the early 2000s.

Gallery
A selection of images related to the period.

See also

2000s in fashion
1980s in fashion

References

 
1990s decade overviews